Mollington could be

Mollington, Cheshire
Mollington, Oxfordshire